The X Factor is a television music talent show franchise originating in the United Kingdom, where it was devised as a replacement for the massively successful Pop Idol (Called Česko hledá SuperStar).

Judges' categories and their contestants

In each season, each judge is allocated a category to mentor and chooses four acts to progress to the live shows. This table shows, for each season, which category each judge was allocated and which acts he or she put through to the live shows.

Key:
 – Winning judge/category. Winners are in bold, eliminated contestants in small font.

Series summary
 "15-24y" category
 "25+ y" category
 "Vocal Groups" category

Season one (2008)

Presenter and Judges
 Leoš Mareš (presenter)
 Gabriela Osvaldová (25+ y)
 Ondřej Soukup (15-24y)
 Petr Janda (Vocal Groups)

Contestants and final ranking

Contestants
Key:
 – Winner
 – Runner-up
 – Third place

Results table
The Contestants labeled yellow were Petr Janda's Contestants (Vocal Groups), the Contestants labeled light blue were Ondrej Soukup's Contestants (15–24 years) and the Contestants labeled dark blue were Gabina Osvaldová's (25+ years).

Live show details

Week 1 (23 March 2008)

Theme: Fire Night
Special Guest: Shayne Ward

Judges' votes to eliminate
 Janda: Lukáš Javůrek
 Osvaldová: Romantic
 Soukup: Romantic

Week 2 (30 March 2008)

Theme: Chocolate Night
Special Guest: Gipsy.cz

Judges' votes to eliminate
 Janda: Lukáš Javůrek
 Osvaldová: Divoký kočky + Dante
 Soukup: Lukáš Javůrek

Week 3 (6 April 2008)

Theme: Popcorn Night
Special Guest: Iva Frühlingová

Judges' votes to eliminate
 Soukup: Divoký kočky + Dante
 Janda: Anna Ungrová
 Osvaldová: Divoký kočky + Dante

Week 4 (13 April 2008)

Theme: Tribute to Karel
Special Guest: Karel Gott

Judges' votes to eliminate
 Soukup: Pavlína Ďuriačová
 Janda: Pavlína Ďuriačová
 Osvaldová: Did not vote as there was already a majority

Week 5 (20 April 2008)

Theme: Night of Broken Hearts
Special Guest: Helena Zeťová

Judges' votes to eliminate
 Soukup: All X
 Janda: Anna Ungrová
 Osvaldová: Anna Ungrová

Week 6 (27 April 2008)

Theme: Banana Night
Special Guest: Karl Wolf

Judges' votes to eliminate
 Soukup: Martina Pártlová
 Osvaldová: David Gránský
 Janda: David Gránský

Week 7 (4 May 2008)

Theme: Czechoslovak Night
Special Guest: Miro Žbirka

Judges' votes to eliminate
 Janda: Martina Pártlová
 Osvaldová: Za 5 dvanáct
 Soukup: Za 5 dvanáct

Week 8 (11 May 2008)

Theme: Night of Revived Legends
Special Guest: Zombies (dancing on Michael Jackson's "Thriller")

Judges' votes to eliminate
 Soukup: All X
 Janda: Kamila Nývltová
 Osvaldová: Kamila Nývltová

Week 9 (18 May 2008)

Theme: American Night
Special Guest: Láďa Kerndl and Henry Lee

See also
 Česko Slovenská Superstar
 The 100 Greatest Slovak Albums of All Time

Czech Republic
Czech reality television series
Czech music television series
TV Nova (Czech TV channel) original programming
Television series by Fremantle (company)
2008 Czech television series debuts
2008 Czech television series endings
Czech television series based on British television series